HMAS Gilolo is a former Royal Australian Navy (RAN) shore naval base on Gililo (now Halmahera),  in the Maluku Islands, Dutch East Indies (now Indonesia).

See also
List of former Royal Australian Navy bases
Japanese occupation of the Dutch East Indies

References

Gilolo
Maluku Islands